Westside Church, (also known as Cross Kirk), is a ruined 12th century church located on the island of Westray in Orkney, Scotland. Archaeological excavations at the site suggest that the church is related to a nearby late Norse settlement. Historic Environment Scotland established the site, which includes the church and surrounding cemetery, as a scheduled monument in 1921.

Description
The stone remains of Westside church are located on the south shore of the Ness of Tuquoy on the island of Westray in Orkney, Scotland. The original church dates to the 12th century.
The vaulted chancel is entered from the nave through a rounded doorway. The nave was lengthened westward during the 17th century when the parish church needed to accommodate the growing population on the island and a larger congregation.

Westside church is enclosed by a walled burial ground. Approximately  to the west of the church, coastal erosion has uncovered the remains of a large late Norse settlement. Archaeological excavations at the site suggest the church was probably built to serve the settlement. Historic Environment Scotland established the site, which includes the church and burial ground, as a scheduled monument in 1921.

See also
St Boniface's Church, Papa Westray
St Olaf's Church, Unst
List of churches in Orkney

Resources

Historic Scotland properties in Orkney
Scheduled Ancient Monuments in Orkney
Churches in Orkney